Akkayin is a district of North Kazakhstan Region in northern Kazakhstan. The administrative center of the district is the selo of Smirnovo. Population:

Geography 
Part of Shaglyteniz lake is located in the district.

References

Districts of Kazakhstan
North Kazakhstan Region